La Chapelle-Saint-Martial is a commune in the Creuse department in the Nouvelle-Aquitaine region in central France.

Geography

Population

Sights
 The church of Notre-Dame, dating from the twelfth century.
 The chateau.
 Traces of a Roman villa.
 Two menhirs.

See also
Communes of the Creuse department

References

Communes of Creuse